John Ranson Lewis III (born July 18, 1945 in Charlotte, North Carolina), better known as Randy Lewis is a five-time starter of the Indianapolis 500 USA automobile race.  His best starting position was 11th in 1988 and 1989.  His best finish was 14th in 1990 and 1991.  His last race at Indy was the 1991 Indianapolis 500. In his 81 CART starts his best finish was an 8th in 1987. He started his career in Formula Three in Europe and gradually moved up to the Formula 5000, then the Can-Am series.

Motorsports career results

American open–wheel results
(key) (Races in bold indicate pole position)

CART/Indy Car

Series Summary

Indianapolis 500 results

See also
List of celebrities who own wineries and vineyards

References

1945 births
Champ Car drivers
Indianapolis 500 drivers
Living people
Racing drivers from Charlotte, North Carolina
SCCA Formula Super Vee drivers

Dale Coyne Racing drivers